Old Baldy is a  mountain summit located in the Fisher Range of Kananaskis Country in the Canadian Rockies of Alberta, Canada. Old Baldy's nearest higher peak is Mount Kidd,  to the west-southwest.

Geology
Old Baldy is composed of sedimentary rock laid down during the Precambrian to Jurassic periods. Formed in shallow seas, this sedimentary rock was pushed east and over the top of younger rock during the Laramide orogeny.

Climate
Based on the Köppen climate classification, Old Baldy is located in a subarctic climate with cold, snowy winters, and mild summers. Precipitation runoff from the mountain drains into tributaries of the Kananaskis River.

See also
List of mountains in the Canadian Rockies
Geology of Alberta

References

External links
 Localized weather: Mountain Forecast
 Old Baldy Mountain: stevensong.com
  

Two-thousanders of Alberta
Canadian Rockies
Alberta's Rockies